The Roman Catholic Diocese of Taubaté is a diocese located in the city of Taubaté in the Ecclesiastical province of Aparecida in Brazil.

History
7 June 1908: Established as Diocese of Taubaté from the Diocese of São Paulo

Special churches
Minor Basilicas:
Basílica do Senhor Bom Jesus, Tremembé, São Paulo

Leadership
Bishops of Taubaté (Roman rite) in reverse chronological order
Bishop Wilson Luís Angotti Filho (15 April 2015 – present)
Bishop Carmo João Rhoden, S.C.J. (22 May 1996 – 14 April 2015)
Bishop Antônio Afonso de Miranda, S.D.N. (6 August 1981 – 22 May 1996)
Bishop José Antônio do Couto, S.C.I. (5 May 1976 – 6 August 1981)
Bishop Francisco do Borja Pereira do Amaral (3 October 1944 – 5 May 1976)
Bishop André Arcoverde de Albuquerque Cavalcanti (8 August 1936 – 8 November 1941)
Bishop Epaminondas Nuñez de Ávila e Silva (29 April 1909 – 29 June 1935)

Other affiliated bishops

Coadjutor bishop
José Antônio do Couto, S.C.I. (1974-1976)

Auxiliary bishop
Gabriel Paulino Bueno Couto, O. Carm. (1955-1965), appointed Auxiliary Bishop of São Paulo

Other priest of this diocese who became bishop
Benedito Beni dos Santos, appointed  Auxiliary Bishop of São Paulo in 2001

References
GCatholic.org
Catholic Hierarchy
Diocese website (Portuguese)

Roman Catholic dioceses in Brazil
Taubaté, Roman Catholic Diocese of
Christian organizations established in 1908
Roman Catholic dioceses and prelatures established in the 20th century
1908 establishments in Brazil